The Down Under Bowl, often spelled Downwinder Bowl or abbreviated DUB, is an annual American football competition, which started in 1990. Held on the Gold Coast, Australia, hundreds of high school American football players, coaches, cheerleaders and officials come to participate in the event, making it the largest American Football Championship Tournament held outside the United States. Australia and New Zealand also send teams to compete in the competition.

The event is held annually with games held towards the end of June. Championships are usually held on 3 July with the athlete's street parade and closing ceremony on 4 July, the United States Independence Day.

Teams are divided into brackets of four teams, with each team playing two games. The outcome of the first game determines whether a team's second game is a consolation or championship game. Games are played according to high school federation rules, officiated with one referee flown from the United States and the other officials supplied by Queensland Gridiron Officials Association.

See also

External links
Down Under Bowl official site

References

Down Under Sports Tours - About Us Retrieved on 20 April 2007.
CSHM - Down Under Bowl Retrieved on 20 April 2007.
Down Under Bowl official site (currently offline) Retrieved on 15 March 2007.

American football in Australia
Sport on the Gold Coast, Queensland
American football competitions
Recurring sporting events established in 1988
1988 establishments in Australia